The 2020 Saudi Super Cup (also known as The Berain Saudi Super Cup for sponsorship reasons) was the 7th edition of the Saudi Super Cup, an annual football match played between the winners of the previous season's Saudi Pro League and King's Cup. It was played on 30 January 2021 for the second time at the King Fahd International Stadium, Riyadh, between Al-Hilal and Al-Nassr. With Al-Hilal winning both the 2019–20 Saudi Pro League championship and the 2019–20 King Cup, the game was played between Al-Hilal and the 2019–20 Saudi Pro League runners-up, Al-Nassr.

The match was held behind closed doors due to the COVID-19 pandemic.

Al-Nassr defeated Al-Hilal 3–0 to win their second title. They became the first team to win two consecutive titles and also set the record for the biggest goal margin.

Venue
The King Fahd International Stadium was announced as the venue of the final on 20 December 2020. This was the second time the King Fahd International Stadium hosted the final and the fourth time it was hosted in Saudi Arabia.

The King Fahd International Stadium was built in 1982 and was opened in 1987. The stadium was used as a venue for the 1992, 1995, and the 1997 editions of the FIFA Confederations Cup. Its current capacity is 68,752 and it is used by the Saudi Arabia national football team, Al-Hilal, Al-Shabab, and major domestic matches.

Background

As part of a sponsorship deal between the Saudi Arabian Football Federation (SAFF) and Saudi water company Berain, the match was officially referred to as "The Berain Saudi Super Cup".

This was Al-Hilal's fourth appearance in the competition and first since 2018. Al-Hilal won the title twice, in 2015 and 2018, and finished as runners-up once, in 2016 Saudi Super Cup. This was Al-Nassr's fourth appearance in the competition and their second consecutive appearance. Al-Nassr finished as runners-up in both the 2014 and 2015 editions of the Super Cup and won their first title in 2019.

Al-Hilal qualified by winning the 2019–20 Saudi Professional League on 29 August 2020. Al-Nassr qualified after defeating Al-Ahli in the semi-finals of the 2019–20 King Cup, as Al-Hilal were their opponents in the King Cup Final and had already qualified for the Super Cup as league winners. On 28 November 2020, Al-Hilal defeated Al-Nassr 2–1 in the final of the King Cup.

This was the second meeting between these two sides in the Saudi Super Cup. Al-Hilal won in 2015 after defeating Al-Nassr 1–0 thanks to a goal from Carlos Eduardo. This was the eleventh final between these two sides, with five wins apiece in previous results. This was the 170th competitive meeting between the two.

Match

Details